Caroline Kathryn Allen (April 7, 1904 - April 6, 1975) was an American botanist, botanical illustrator and taxonomist noted for studying trees in the laurel family.  She was a staff member at both the Arnold Arboretum and New York Botanical Garden. She described over 275 species, and contributed widely in academic publications.

References 

1904 births
1975 deaths
American women botanists
20th-century American women
People from Pawling, New York
Harvard University staff